This is a list of films which placed number-one at the Weekly box office in Hong Kong during 2023.

Highest-grossing films

See also
 2023 in Hong Kong
 List of Hong Kong films of 2023
 List of 2022 box office number-one films in Hong Kong

References

External links
 Weekly Box Office | Hong Kong International Film & TV Market (FILMART) 2023
 2023 Hong Kong Box Office Revenue: Weekly Index Table in 

Hong Kong
2023 in Hong Kong
2023
Hong Kong film-related lists